Dmitri Vladimirovich Bushmanov (born 30 September 1978) is a former Russian professional footballer.

Club career
He made his debut in the Russian Premier League in 1997 for FC Tyumen.

References

1978 births
People from Kurgan, Kurgan Oblast
Living people
Russian footballers
Association football midfielders
FC Tobol Kurgan players
FC Tyumen players
Russian Premier League players
FC Zhemchuzhina Sochi players
FC Moscow players
FC Dynamo Stavropol players
FC Ural Yekaterinburg players
Sportspeople from Kurgan Oblast